Pygoda expolita is a species of stink bug in the family Pentatomidae found in Costa Rica and Panamá. It was first described as Edessa expolita by William Lucas Distant in 1892 and renamed under genus Pygoda in 2018.

References

Pentatomidae
Insects described in 1892